Relli-valasa is a village in Pusapatirega mandal of Vizianagaram district. It is one of the villages in Nellimarla constituency. Surrounded and protected by three goddess. Politically strong and developed village.

Demographics
According to Indian census, 2001, the demographic details of Rellivalasa village were:
 Total Population: 7,259 in 1,640 households
 Males 3,612; females 3,647
 Children Under 6 years of age: 963 (boys 466, girls 497)
 Total literates: 2,573

Political
 Baddukonda Appala Naidu – Member of Legislative Assembly (Nellimarla constituency)
 1983 - Pathivada Narayana Swamy Naidu, Telugu Desam Party
 1985 - Pathivada Narayana Swamy Naidu, Telugu Desam Party
 1989 - Pathivada Narayana Swamy Naidu, Telugu Desam Party
 1994 - Pathivada Narayana Swamy Naidu, Telugu Desam Party
 1999 - Pathivada Narayana Swamy Naidu, Telugu Desam Party
 2004 - Pathivada Narayana Swamy Naidu, Telugu Desam Party
2009 - Baddukonda Appala Naidu, National Congress Party
 2014 - Pathivada Narayana Swamy Naidu, Telugu Desam Party
2019 - Baddukonda Appala Naidu, YSR Congress Party

References

Villages in Vizianagaram district